The Swiss Centre for Affective Sciences ( or "CISA") is an interdisciplinary research centre based in Geneva. Founded in 2003, the focus of its research is the emotions or affective science. It is one of 20 Swiss Government funded NCCR (National Centres for Competence in Research). The centre was headed by Professor Klaus Scherer, is now headed by David Sander, and researches emotions in the areas of cognitive neuroscience, psychology, linguistics, philosophy, economics, archaeology and affective computing. It has project focuses in cognitive appraisal, expression, social and legal regulation, norms and values and aesthetic emotions. Over 100 researchers from different universities attend in the NCCR Affective Sciences.

The Swiss National Centre of Competence in Research tries to train as many new affective young scientists as possible. They have a program devoted to the Education and Training Program which helps train and prepare researchers in the affective sciences for the future. The goal of Education and Training Program is to encourage approach towards affective phenomena without losing the punitive profession required for a professional career between disciplines.
There is an annual program called the International Summer School in Affective Sciences (ISSAS) which is available for young researchers worldwide. The summer school tries to bring together arts and emotions of students using many methods including literature, neuroscience, psychology, and musicology.

The Centre's main research goals include attempting to understand affective phenomena, such as emotions and motivation, through research and analysis. Affective phenomena are complex and difficult to understand. They are described as intricate events in human behaviour and experience.

The centre focusses on three parts of emotions: emotions being complicated reactions to our surroundings, emotions as being disruptive and needing conscious control and regulation and emotions as being a regulating force of today’s society. Therefore, individual research projects are organized around three main categories of research relating to these aspects: emotion awareness and elicitation, emotion regulation and the social purposes of emotions.

Notes and references

International summer school in affective sciences. (n.d.). Retrieved from http://www.affective-sciences.org/issas

External links
Official website - http://www.affective-sciences.org/
 http://www.affective-sciences.org/teaching-activities

Philosophy institutes